Arkansas Highway 59 is a north–south state highway in Northwest Arkansas. The route runs  from Arkansas Highway 22 in Barling north to the Missouri state line through Van Buren, the county seat of Crawford County. Highway 59 parallels US 59 (in Oklahoma) between Siloam Springs and Fort Smith.  Since US 59 goes through Arkansas, AR 59 is the only Arkansas state highway to share its numbering with a federal highway that goes through Arkansas.

Route description

The route begins in Barling at AR 22. The route runs north to enter Van Buren, crossing I-540 and briefly concurring with US 64. The concurrency begins near the Joseph Starr Dunham House and  before crossing Interstate 40. The route exits town northbound, intersecting rural highways AR 162 and AR 220 in Cedarville and crossing Lee Creek on the historic Lee Creek Bridge. At this time, AR 59 is running through the Boston Mountains subdivision of The Ozarks. North of Cedarville, AR 59 curves west toward Oklahoma, coming within  of the border.

Entering Washington County, the route meets Arkansas Highway 156 in Evansville and AR 244 in Tofu. The route continues north to Dutch Mills and Summers before entering Siloam Springs.

Upon entering Benton County, AR 59 concurs with US 412 east around the southeast edge of Siloam Springs. The concurrency ends and AR 59 continues north to Gentry. AR 59 passes near Kansas City-Southern Railway cars and Kansas City-Southern Depot in Decatur. The route continues north to AR 72 and the Kansas City Southern Railway Caboose No. 383 in Gravette. The highway runs further north to Wee Pine Knot, the Adar House, and Butler Creek Cemetery in Sulphur Springs. AR 59 meets Missouri Route 59 at the Missouri state line and terminates.

History
When Arkansas established its first numbered state highway system in 1926, Arkansas Highway 59 was designated for a route that led from the Louisiana state line to Eudora. The South Arkansas route later became AR 159, and the 59 number moved to northwest Arkansas. In 1936, AR 59 traveled from Van Buren north to Siloam Springs. From AR 72 at Gravette, north to the Missouri state line, AR 59 is the original alignment of US 71. The roadway continues north into Missouri as Missouri Route 59.

The route was widened by the AHTD in 2007 around Siloam Springs.

Major intersections

Special routes
AR 59 has two special routes, both in Gentry.

Gentry business route

Arkansas Highway 59 Business is a  business route in Gentry.

Gentry spur

Arkansas Highway 59 Spur is a  spur route in Gentry.

See also

References

External links

059
Transportation in Sebastian County, Arkansas
Transportation in Crawford County, Arkansas
Transportation in Washington County, Arkansas
Transportation in Benton County, Arkansas
U.S. Route 71
Siloam Springs, Arkansas